Naxxar Lions Football Club is a football club from the town of Naxxar in northern Malta. 

Their historical and arch-rivals are Mosta FC. A match between Naxxar Lions and Mosta FC, is known as the derby of the north, but because there are other derbies in northern Malta it is also known as the Northern Classic.

History
Naxxar Lions Football Club is a football club from the town of Naxxar in the northern part of Malta. Founded in 1920, it was the first football club in the north of Malta. 

The club had a very positive period in the 1940s and after some years languishing in the lower divisions, the club had several years of glory. In 1946 they secured promotion on the top flight division after winning the decider against Ħamrun Liberty. Michael Zammit Tabona was appointed president in the 1980s, establishing the club as one of the best on the island, playing for several years in the Maltese Premier Division. After being relegated from the top league at the beginning of the new century, the club had to face a difficult period and was relegated to third division a few years ago. 

Following the recent successful seasons Naxxar Lions were promoted from 3rd Division to 2nd Division in season 2009–10, from 2nd Division to 1st Division in season 2010–11 and maintaining 1st Division status in season 2011–12 placing in 6th position. In the 2012–13 season Naxxar Lions gained promotion to the Maltese Premier League with Dione Drago as the president. After three consecutive years in the Premier League, they were relegated back to first division. The following season, Naxxar Lions gained again promotion to the Maltese Premier League under the Presidency of Pierre Sciberras. 

In September 2017, Mr Yahya Kirdi took over Naxxar Lions Football Club and was appointed as President. Naxxar Lions were relegated to the first division in the last match of the Premier League. During Season 2018-19, against all odds, Naxxar Lions FC managed to finish in the 4th place of the First Division League. 

Pierre Sciberras was re-appointed the club President for Season 2019-20 which ended in March 2020 due to the Covid-19 situation, finishing  4th place. Naxxar Lions FC played Season 2020/21 in the BOV Challenge League, with the league ending early due to COVID (6th position with two matches less).  

Naxxar Lions FC celebrated the 100 Years Anniversary (1920-2020). Angelo Pullicino was appointed as Club President in December 2020. During Season 2021/22, the club played again in the Challenge League and finished in the top 4 (4th). 

Naxxar Lions FC is playing in the BOV Challenge League (Season 2022/23). In January 2023, Naxxar Lions reached the Championship Pool target, finishing 2nd place. On March 12th, Naxxar Lions FC were mathematically promoted to Premier League.

Club Committee  

 President - Angelo Pullicino 
 Vice Presidents - Clifford Galea Vella / Krista Chetcuti 
 Secretary - Simon Camilleri 
 Asst.Secretary - Clint Muscat 
 Treasurer - Shaun Camilleri 
 MFA Council Member - Angelo Pullicino  
 Members - Victor Bellia / Sandro Galea / James Fenech / Silvio Attard

Technical Staff  

 Head coach - George Vella 
 Assistant coach - Leslie Noel Burke 
 Team Manager - Adrian Ciappara 
 Kit Manager - Luke Bezzina / Clivert Burke / Nicholas Micallef 
 Youths Coach - Etienne Vella  
 Technical director - Omar Borg  
 Club doctor - Dr. Christopher Deguara  
 Nursery Head Coach - Quelin Spiteri 
 Nursery Representative - James Fenech 
 Club Administrators - Adrian Ciappara 
 Website & Social Media Administrator - Shaun Camilleri

Current squad

References

External links

 
Association football clubs established in 1920
Football clubs in Malta
1920 establishments in Malta